The X Factor Israel is the Israeli version of the British television music competition The X Factor. The fourth season run between October 30, 2021, and February 5, 2022, on Reshet 13, airing in prime time.

On April 6, 2021, it was announced that the winner of this season would represent  in the Eurovision Song Contest 2022. Michael Ben David was the selected entrant with the song "I.M".

Judges and hosts 
 hosts the fourth season. All the members of the judging panel changed from the previous season: Mizrahi singer Margalit Tzan'ani, singer-songwriter Aviv Geffen, singer and Eurovision 2018 winner Netta Barzilai, while a fourth and fifth judges revealed to be Ran Danker and Miri Mesika, making it the first season of X Factor Israel to feature five judges instead of four.

Show creator Simon Cowell was originally announced as a judge for the season before pulling out.

Auditions 
The auditions started on October 30, 2021, and ended on December 12. Contestants need to get "yes" from at least four of the five judges in order to qualify.

TV host Guy Zu-Aretz participated in the auditions as well, but only as a cameo.

Judge Houses 
The Judge Houses have begun on December 14, 2021. The judges had to choose from each of their categories 4 out of their 8 members (asides the Groups and Over 25's group, which consists 9 members). 

Key:
 – Eliminated in the judges' house

Chairs

Key:
 – Received a chair and passed to the Live Shows
 – Received a chair, was later replaced and eventually eliminated
 – Didn’t receive a chair and was eliminated

Live shows
Live shows began on December 26, 2021.

Results summary 

Color key

Live show details

Week 1

Sunday (December 26)

Thursday (December 30)

Week 2

Sunday (January 2)

Thursday (January 6)

Week 3

Sunday (January 9)

Tuesday (January 11)

Week 4

Sunday (January 16)

Tuesday (January 18)

Week 5

Sunday (January 23)

Thursday (January 27)

Song selection round 
Each of the four finalists was given two songs as selected from a public submission by a six-member committee (made up of the director of IPBC/Kan's radio stations, three radio representatives, one television representative and one representative of Reshet 13). The assessment to choose the songs began by mid-November 2021.

On 30 January 2022, the eight songs that qualified for the selection were revealed. Viewers were invited to vote on one of two songs given to each finalist, with voting open to the public on Kan's website and app. On 3 February 2022, each finalist performed both songs they were given during a special selection show, alternatively titled  ("Our Song for Eurovision"), which was broadcast on Kan 11, Kan Gimel and Kan's digital platforms. The finalists' chosen songs were determined by the viewers (50% of the vote), the judges (25% of the vote) and the professional committee (25% of the vote).

Final 
The final was held on 5 February 2022 and took place in the following format: in the first stage, the four finalists performed a special cover version of an existing song they have chosen. Immediately after the first performance, one finalist was be eliminated. In the second stage, the remaining three finalists performed the song that was chosen for them to perform at Eurovision. The results are determined by the viewers (50% of the vote), the judges (25% of the vote) and the professional committee (25% of the vote).

References

External links 
 

2021 Israeli television seasons
2022 Israeli television seasons
Israel
Israel in the Eurovision Song Contest